The Schoenhofen Pyramid Mausoleum is a tomb in Graceland Cemetery, Chicago. It was designed by Chicago School architect Richard E. Schmidt as a family mausoleum for the Chicago brewer Peter Schoenhofen.

History
Well-known Chicago brewer Peter Schoenhofen (born in Dörbach, then Prussia, in 1827; died in 1893) his Schoenhofen Brewing Company was among the largest in Chicago in 1880. Schoenhofen's family mausoleum was designed by Richard E. Schmidt, a Chicago School architect, in 1893, with construction beginning on July 1 of that year. The mausoleum is internationally famous and is one of the most photographed mausoleums at Graceland Cemetery.

Architecture
The Schoenhofen Pyramid Mausoleum is a steep sided tomb designed, like many of the monuments at Chicago's Graceland Cemetery, in the Egyptian Revival style. The tomb is a family mausoleum constructed from gray granite. The pyramid structure is set upon a square base. To the left of the entryway, is an angel, on the right of the entry stands a sphinx. The pyramid's design combines both Egyptian (the sphinx) and Christian (the angel) symbols. Regardless, the American Institute of Architects' Chicago guide book called the angel "rather out-of-place". The door to the pyramid is styled after the gateways at Karnak, in Egypt, and is 40 inches wide by 84 inches high. A bronze molding of bundled reeds surrounds the door and the door's themselves feature cast lotus designs with coiled asps around the handles.

While the Schoenhofen Mausoleum is a pyramid, and referred to as such, its design is only Egyptian-inspired. The angel on the tomb base is clearly not Egyptian and even the sphinx merely takes its inspiration from Egyptian architecture. There are several historical works that are considered related to the Schoenhofen Mausoleum. The Roman funerary pyramid of Caius Cestius is considered a historical predecessor to the Schoenhofen Mausoleum. Perhaps more closely related are the pyramid by Louis Carrogis Carmontelle at Parc Monceau in Paris and a cenotaph by Antonio Canova that was erected as the tomb of Maria Christina in Vienna at the Augustinian Church.

See also
 List of pyramid mausoleums in North America

References
Kiefer, Charles D., Achilles, Rolf, and Vogel, Neil A. "Graceland Cemetery" (pdf), National Register of Historic Places Registration Form, HAARGIS Database, Illinois Historic Preservation Agency, June 18, 2000, accessed October 8, 2011.
 Brand, Gregor: Peter Schoenhofen. US-Bierbrauer aus Dörbach. http://www.eifelzeitung.de/redaktion/kinder-der-eifel/peter-schoenhofen-13529/ (in German).

Notes

Graceland Cemetery
Pyramids in the United States
Egyptian Revival architecture in Illinois
Chicago school architecture in Illinois
Historic district contributing properties in Illinois
Buildings and structures completed in 1893
National Register of Historic Places in Chicago
Monuments and memorials on the National Register of Historic Places in Illinois
Mausoleums on the National Register of Historic Places
1893 establishments in Illinois